The China Airlines Group is the organizational designation used by a conglomerate of transportation and associated service companies based out of Taiwan, officially the Republic of China.

Subsidiaries

China Airlines

China Airlines is Republic of China's (Taiwan) largest airline, operating regular flights to over 90 destinations worldwide.  China Airlines features full passenger and dedicated cargo operations to North America, Asia, Europe, and Oceania.

Mandarin Airlines

Mandarin Airlines is a subsidiary of China Airlines.  Mandarin Airlines features full passenger operations to Asia. Originally, Mandarin Airlines flew many of China Airline's International Routes into countries aligned with the PRC.

Tigerair Taiwan

Tigerair Taiwan is a low-cost carrier which commenced services in 2014. The airline was a joint venture between China Airlines and Tigerair Holdings but is now wholly owned by China Airlines Group as of 2017.

Novotel Taipei Taoyuan International Airport
Novotel Taipei Taoyuan International Airport is a hotel located beside Taiwan Taoyuan International Airport.  It has 360 rooms and suites and a Premier Lounge with views of the airport runway located at Premier Floor.

Taoyuan International Airport Services

Taoyuan International Airport Services (commonly abbreviated 桃園航勤), founded in 1979, is currently the largest ground handling provider at Taoyuan International Airport, providing services for 30 scheduled airlines, out of 38 that served in Taoyuan International Airport.

China Pacific Catering Services

China Pacific Catering Services is a catering service, it is located adjacent to Taipei's Taoyuan International Airport. The company's automated facilities have the capacity to produce up to 30,000 meals a day. Currently, the kitchen serves 22 international airlines in addition to China Airlines. The company also provides outside catering and terminal catering services.

Taiwan Air Cargo Terminal

Taiwan Air Cargo Terminal Limited is a company that provides physical cargo handling service to import, export and transshipment cargo.

Headquarters

CAL Park is the headquarters of China Airlines Group.

External links
 Official Website

 
Companies listed on the Taiwan Stock Exchange
Association of Asia Pacific Airlines
Government-owned companies of Taiwan
Companies based in Taoyuan City
Airline holding companies